Established and achieved self-government for a maroon colony of freed Africans.
Gaspar Yanga—often simply Yanga or Nyanga (May 14, 1545 - 1618) was an African who led a maroon colony of  enslaved Africans in the highlands near Veracruz, Mexico (then New Spain) during the early period of Spanish colonial rule. He successfully resisted a Spanish attack on the colony in 1609. The maroons continued their raids on Spanish settlements. Finally in 1618, Yanga achieved an agreement with the colonial government for self-rule of the maroon settlement. It was later called San Lorenzo de los Negros, and also San Lorenzo de Cerralvo. 

In the late 19th century, Yanga was named as a "national hero of Mexico" and "The first liberator of America" ("El Primer Libertador de América"). In 1932 the settlement he formed, located in today's state of Veracruz, was renamed as Yanga in his honor.

Early life
Yanga, aka Nyanga, was said to be of the Bran people and a member of the royal family of Gabon. He was captured and sold into slavery in Mexico, where he was called Gaspar Yanga. Before the end of the slave trade, New Spain had the sixth-highest slave population (estimated 200,000) of the Americas after Brazil (over 4.9 million), the Caribbean (over 4 million), Cuba (over 1 million), Hispaniola and the United States (half a million).

Around 1570, Yanga led a band of slaves in escaping to the highlands near Veracruz. They built a small maroon colony, or palenque. Its isolation helped protect it for more than 30 years, and other fugitive slaves found their way there. Because the people survived in part by raiding caravans taking goods along the Camino Real (Royal Road) between Veracruz and Mexico City, in 1609 the Spanish colonial government decided to undertake a campaign to regain control of this territory.

Yanga's Rebellion 
According to the historian Adriana Naveda, Nyanga fled his enslaver in approximately 1570 and took refuge close to what is now the city of Córdoba, leading a group of maroons that gradually grew in number. Although there is no full knowledge of how their movement developed, by 1609 the group included more than 500 men; consequently, rumors of a large-scale revolt were not long in coming.

Warnings increased during the reign of viceroy Luis de Velasco, trying to alert the viceroy of a possible Black uprising on January 6th of that year. According to the rumors, this uprising would see the runaways murder whites and name a Black maroon as king. De Velasco did not give this possibility much importance, responding only by ordering the whipping of several enslaved people who had already been imprisoned for other kinds of crimes. But the danger became evident when Nyanga’s group began to plunder the region’s haciendas.  Many historians agree that the land occupied by these apalencados (i.e., palenque-dwellers) was the area surrounding the Cofre de Perote, the Sierra de Zongolica, and the area of Omealca, in what is now the state of Veracruz.

Nyanga’s maroons not only plundered the haciendas and farms within their reach in order to survive: they also attacked the Viceroyalty-era Mexico-Veracruz road, which connected the Gulf’s main port with the capital of New Spain. These attacks were worrisome for the authorities, as, throughout the colonial period, this road was the most transit and communication route in the Americas and its economic importance was essential for the development of New Spain.

This led the viceroy to send militias to subdue the bellicose group. However, the fugitives were able to defend themselves on multiple occasions, as their hiding places were difficult to access and allowed the maroons to quickly defend themselves. This rebellion did not meet the same fate as others did: losses were high, and attacks on the royal road destabilized the viceregal economy. Most affected was the port of Veracruz, whose commodity flow was damaged. This was what, in this case, made waging a war against the maroons an unprofitable and hopeless enterprise.

In 1609, news spread that the Africans intended to kill the inhabitants of the capital and crown one of their own (Yanga), leading the viceroy to take extreme measures against the rebels. Three years later, rumors would come that many Blacks who had been defeated had been dismembered and nailed to pieces along the main roads to serve as an example to the rebels.

In the 16th century, Africans made up 6% (20,569) of the population. Given the need for labor, shipments of Africans would increase. By 1646, there was an average of almost 168,000 enslaved Blacks in New Spain.

Spanish 1609 attack
Led by the soldier Pedro González de Herrera, about 550 Spanish troops set out from Puebla in January; an estimated 100 were Spanish regulars and the rest conscripts and adventurers. The maroons were an irregular force of 100 fighters having some type of firearm, and 400 more armed with stones, machetes, bows and arrows, and the like.  These maroon troops were led by Francisco de la Matosa, an Angolan. Yanga—who was quite old by this time—decided to use his troops' superior knowledge of the terrain to resist the Spaniards, with the goal of causing them enough pain to draw them to the negotiating table.

Upon the approach of the Spanish troops, Yanga sent terms of peace via a captured Spaniard. He asked for a treaty akin to those that had settled hostilities between Indians and Spaniards: an area of self-rule in return for tribute and promises to support the Spanish if they were attacked. In addition, Yanga said this proposed district would return any slaves who might flee to it. This last concession was necessary to soothe the worries of the many slave owners in the region.  

The Spaniards refused the terms and went into battle, resulting in heavy losses for both sides. The Spaniards advanced into the maroon settlement and burned it. But, the maroons fought fiercely and were well accustomed to the surrounding terrain. The Spaniards could not achieve a conclusive victory.  The resulting stalemate lasted years; finally, the Spanish agreed to parley. Yanga's terms were agreed to, with the additional provisos that only Franciscan priests (including Alonso de Benavides) would tend to the people, and that Yanga's family would be granted the right of rule. In 1618 the treaty was signed. By 1630 the town of San Lorenzo de los Negros de Cerralvo was established.  Located in today's Veracruz province, the town in the 21st century is known as Yanga.

Legacy and honors
In 1871, five decades after Mexican independence, Yanga was designated as a "national hero of Mexico" and El Primer Libertador de las Americas. This was based largely on an account by historian Vicente Riva Palacio. The influential Riva Palacio was also a novelist, short story writer, military general, and mayor of Mexico City. In the late 1860s he found in Inquisition archives accounts of Yanga and of the 1609 Spanish expedition against him, as well as the later agreement. He published an account of Yanga in an anthology in 1870, and as a separate pamphlet in 1873. Reprints have followed, including a recent edition in 1997. Much of the subsequent writing about Yanga was influenced by the works of Riva Palacio. He characterized the maroons of San Lorenzo de los Negros as proud men who would not be defeated.

See also
Benkos Biohó
Vicente Guerrero
Zumbi dos Palmares

References

Further reading

External links
Luis Camilla, "Gaspar Yanga", Black Past

Mexican soldiers
Rebel slaves
Mexican slaves
Maroons (people)
Mexican people of Gabonese descent
16th-century slaves
16th-century rebels